I Lost My Heart on a Bus (German: Ich hab mein Herz im Autobus verloren) is a 1929 German silent comedy film directed by Carlo Campogalliani and Domenico Gambino and starring Domenico Gambino, Truus Van Aalten and Lydia Potechina. The title is a reference to a popular song I Lost My Heart in Heidelberg. It was made in Italy.

Cast
 Domenico Gambino as Dorrit  
 Truus Van Aalten as Tommy  
 Lydia Potechina 
 Robert Garrison 
 Philipp Manning 
 Karl Harbacher
 Karl Junge-Swinburne 
 Margarete Sachse

References

Bibliography
 Alfred Krautz. International directory of cinematographers, set- and costume designers in film, Volume 4. Saur, 1984.

External links

1929 films
Films of the Weimar Republic
German silent feature films
Films directed by Carlo Campogalliani
Films directed by Domenico Gambino
German black-and-white films
1929 comedy films
German comedy films
Silent comedy films
1920s German films